The list of shipwrecks in April 1871 includes ships sunk, foundered, grounded, or otherwise lost during April 1871.

1 April

2 April

3 April

4 April

5 April

6 April

7 April

8 April

9 April

10 April

11 April

13 April

14 April

15 April

16 April

17 April

18 April

19 April

20 April

21 April

22 April

23 April

24 April

25 April

26 April

27 April

28 April

29 April

30 April

Unknown date

References

Bibliography
Ingram, C. W. N., and Wheatley, P. O., (1936) Shipwrecks: New Zealand disasters 1795–1936. Dunedin, NZ: Dunedin Book Publishing Association.

1871-04
Maritime incidents in April 1871